Bibhuti Bhushan Nayak (born 1965) is an Indian journalist, who holds seven Guinness World Records and 12 Limca Book Records in physical strength to his name. He aims to have 72 records to his name. He currently manages his ancestral business, works as a journalist at The Times of India and teaches underprivileged children martial arts to continue the training of breaking world records. Bibhuti sustains himself on a completely vegetarian diet consisting only of pulses and sprouts. Nayak graduated as a management student from Osmania University. In recognition of his physical strength feats, he was given an honorary title of Singh and a pagri (turban) by the Gurudwara where he attempted the record. In addition to that, he is popularly known as the Bruce Lee of Navi Mumbai, for his martial arts and record breaking accolades.

Students 
Three of his students hold records in the Limca Book of Records. One of his students Indresh Naithani, cartwheeled 5 kilometres in a record time of 64 minutes 37 seconds.

Records 
He holds the world record for most concrete slabs broken over the groin with a sledgehammer (three); highest number of one-handed cartwheels in one minute (34); and highest number of sit-ups in one hour (1,448).

Bibhuti holds the following records to his name:

Medical consequences 

In the course of setting the record for the most number of sit ups in one hour, Bibhuti suffered a brain hemorrhage and spent three days in a coma due to the lack of any padding underneath his head and in the process hit the back of his head against the concrete floor 1,448 times.

Biographical book 

His fictional biography has been written by Stephen Kelman, Nominee of the 2011 Booker award for his novel, Pigeon English which was released by Bloomsbury Publishing House on 13 August 2015 in 28 countries. The book is titled Man on Fire.

References

Indian male journalists
1965 births
Living people
Martial artists from Odisha